The FIDE Online Chess Olympiad 2020 was an online chess tournament organised by the Fédération Internationale des Échecs (FIDE) and hosted by Chess.com. It was held between 24 July and 30 August. The event was organised after the 44th Chess Olympiad was postponed due to the COVID-19 pandemic. The final match between Russia and India was called off after several Indian team members experienced connectivity issues due to a global outage of Cloudflare servers; Russia and India were subsequently declared joint winners. The second edition of the tournament was held in 2021.

Participating teams

Gazprom Brilliancy Prize
Gazprom sponsored a brilliancy prize for the event, with the judges being 14 popular streamers and YouTubers: Anna Cramling, Maria Emelianova, Jesse February, Anna-Maja Kazarian, Daniel King, Ayelen Martinez, Carlos Matamoros Franco, Daniel Naroditsky, Antonio Radić, Michael Rahal, IM Eric Rosen, Sagar Shah and Amruta Mokal (joint submission), Fiona Steil-Antoni, and Simon Williams. Nine of the games that were presented to the judges received votes, with the game totaling the most votes being Danyyil Dvirnyy–Alexei Shirov; Shirov, in the Slav Defense, executed a decisive queenside attack involving a queen sacrifice.

References

External links 
 

Chess Olympiads
2020 in chess